The 1914 Kansas Jayhawks football team was an American football team that represented the University of Kansas as a member of the Missouri Valley Conference (MVC) during the 1914 college football season. In their first and only season under head coach H. M. Wheaton, the Jayhawks compiled a 5–2–1 record (2–2 against conference opponents), finished in fourth place in the MVC, and outscored opponents by a total of 158 to 84. The Jayhawks played their home games at McCook Field in Lawrence, Kansas. John Detwiler was the team captain.

Schedule

References

Kansas
Kansas Jayhawks football seasons
Kansas Jayhawks football